Robin de Levita (born April 19, 1959) is a Dutch theatre- and television producer, who produced shows on Broadway and West End and won several Tony Awards.

Career
De Levita produced over a hundred television programs for Dutch media tycoon Joop van den Ende TV-Producties/ Endemol. After that, he started to work internationally. From 1993 - 2001 he lived and worked in New York City, first as managing director of Endemol Theater Productions. His first Broadway production was the musical Cyrano, followed by Victor/Victoria with Julie Andrews.

For five years, De Levita was a partner in Dodger Theatricals and produced Hamlet (with Ralph Fiennes), 42nd Street, Urinetown and Into the Woods among seventeen Broadway shows.

In London, he produced The Who's Tommy, Chicago, West Side Story and The Full Monty. In Europe he oversaw numerous shows for Stage Entertainment, such as The Phantom of the Opera, Miss Saigon, Les Misérables, The Lion King, Cats, Titanic and Cabaret.

De Levita was a member of the Board of Stage Entertainment from 2000 till the end of 2005. In 2005 he started his own production company: Robin de Levita Productions. He developed two musicals with writer/choreographer Sarah Miles and composer/lyricist/record producer John Ewbank: Carmen and Mad Alice.

In February 2011 it was announced that Robin de Levita Productions signed a joint venture with Icelandic producer Vesturport to bring international productions to Broadway, West End and other major markets. The first collaboration between the two was Metamorphosis in the Brooklyn Academy of Music (BAM).

Together with New Productions De Levita is the producer of the musical Soldaat van Oranje (Soldier of Orange), based on the story of a Dutch resistance hero. De Levita invented a new theatrical performance solution for this production: a rotating auditorium in the center of a venue with 1100 seats. He named it SceneAround. Soldier of Orange is the longest running musical in the Netherlands.

De Levita is co-founder and -owner of the international production company Imagine Nation.

In 2014 he produced the critically acclaimed Anne a new contemporary play, based on The Diary of Anne Frank.
It's the first official stage adaptation since a Broadway production in 1950’s and for the first time in history based on the original writings of Anne Frank.
The play was being performed at Theater Amsterdam, a brand new venue, the first in the world, specially built (by Imagine Nation) to host a single play. Designed and constructed in record time.
New York Times: “…Mr. de Levita built the new Theater Amsterdam in eight months.” ANNE is the longest running theatrical performance in the Netherlands.

In 2016 he co-produced the 3D-musical SKY with, amongst others, Dutch singer Marco Borsato in Theater Amsterdam.

De Levita has worked with many high-profile celebrities including: Ralph Fiennes, Julie Andrews, Raquel Welch, Tina Turner, Liza Minnelli, David Bowie and more.

Upcoming shows: Robin de Levita will lead as a producer The Hunger Games stage version production, the Lionsgate hit based on Suzanne Collins’s best-selling trilogy. The play will launch in the summer of 2016. A special theater is being constructed next to Wembley Stadium in London, specifically to present the stage version of the property.

Productions
Broadway
	Cyrano - The Musical
	Victor/Victoria
	Hamlet
	High Society
	Wrong Mountain
	Blast!
	1776
	A Funny Thing Happened on the Way to the Forum
	The King and I
	Titanic
	Footloose
	The Music Man
	42nd Street
	Urinetown
	Into the Woods
	Dracula
	Good Vibrations

Off Broadway
	Savion Glover Downtown
	Minor Demons

The West End
	The Who’s Tommy
	Contact
	Chicago
	West Side Story
	The Full Monty

Germany
	Elisabeth
	The Lion King
	Cats
	The Phantom of the Opera
	Titanic
	AIDA
	Les Misérables
	42nd Street
	Dance of the Vampire
	Blue Man Group

Spain
	Cabaret
	Cats
	Mamma Mia!

The Netherlands
	Barnum
	Sweet Charity
	Cabaret
	Funny Girl
	Sweeney Todd
	My Fair Lady
	Evita
	West Side Story
	Cats (Antwerp)
	Les Misérables
	Elisabeth
	Saturday Night Fever
	Chicago
	Oliver!
	Fame
	Titanic
	Joe de Musical
	Sound of Music
	Mamma Mia!
	André van Duin Revues (6)
	Cyrano – De Musical
	The Phantom of the Opera
	Miss Saigon
	AIDA
	De La Guarda
	The Lion King
	De Fabeltjeskrant Musical
	Soldaat van Oranje (Soldier of Orange)
	Anne
	SKY

Moscow
	Cats

Concerts
	Level 42
	Manhattan Transfer
	Chippendales
	Burning Spear
	Gladiators
	Johnny Cash
	East Village Opera Company

Television
	Over a hundred prime time television entertainment productions for Dutch television for Joop van den Ende/Endemol
	De Fabeltjeskrant (The Daily Fable)

Commercials
	Pepsi (with Tina Turner and David Bowie)

Events
	Fokker 70
	Fokker 100
	100 year Carré theatre spectacle
	Conceived
	Canon Concerto Gala Moscow 2006
	New Year's Eve 2008 Amsterdam Dam Square (Creative Director and Lighting Design)

Awards
	Tony Award for Titanic (1997, Best Musical), 42nd Street (2001, Best Revival), Into the Woods (2002, Best Revival)
Nominated for Cyrano - The Musical, 42nd Street, The Music Man, Urinetown and Into the Woods
	Laurence Olivier Award in 1996 for The Who’s Tommy
	Outer Critics Circle Award for Victor/Victoria (1995), 42nd Street (2000) and Urinetown (2001)
	John Kraaijkamp Musical Award for AIDA (2002), Saturday Night Fever (2003) and De Fabeltjeskrant Musical (2008)

Personal life
De Levita comes from a creative family. His father is TV producer Loek de Levita, best known for producing Dutch children’s television series De Fabeltjeskrant (The Daily Fable), and his mother is journalist Merel Laseur. He is the grandson of actress Mary Dresselhuys and actor/director Cees Laseur and twin brother of television- and film producer Alain de Levita.

External links
	Official website
	Awards

References
	http://www.ibdb.com/person.php?id=70914
	http://pipl.com/directory/people/Robin/De%2520Levita
	http://www.stagevoices.com/stage_voices/2011/02/vesturport-theatre-group-and-robin-de-levita-join-forces-for-international-theatrical-ventures.html
	http://www.variety.com/article/VR1118031896?refCatId=1446
	http://www.variety.com/article/VR1117916733?categoryid=15&cs=1
	http://www.playbill.com/news/article/93123-Robin-De-Levita-Dutch-Showman-and-Former-Endemol-Man-to-Bring-CarmenThe-Musical-to-Broadway
	http://broadwayworld.com/article/Franco_Dragone_Announced_as_Director_for_Carmen_the_Musical_to_Hit_Broadway_20062007_20050907
	http://video.google.com/videoplay?docid=-2586646690536442993#
	http://www.wilde-life.com/articles/1996/see-me-feel-me-tommy-is-back-in-london
	http://movies.nytimes.com/person/721931/Robin-De-Levita/filmography
      http://edition.cnn.com/2014/06/11/travel/anne-frank-play/

1959 births
Living people
Dutch television producers
Dutch theatre managers and producers
Mass media people from Amsterdam